Gran Hermano 12 launched on October 17, 2010 and ended on March 10, 2011, making it the longest season of Gran Hermano to date, just lasting a day longer than the previous series. It took place after Gran Hermano: El Reencuentro. This is the twelfth Spanish edition of the reality franchise Big Brother. The main show which consists of nominations and evictions are known as the Gala and El Debate, a weekly spin-off show, where recently evicted housemates will return. The tag line for this edition is "La Cuarta Dimensión" (The fourth dimension). The grand prize this season is €300,000.

In the 2015 season "Gran Hermano VIP 3", Chari returned to the house.

In the 2016 season "Gran Hermano VIP 4", Laura returned to the house.

Housemates
Casting for potential Gran Hermano 12 housemates started during the last weeks of Gran Hermano 11. Casting calls were held during the summer of 2010 in cities all over Spain. The casting via phone line closed in August 2010 and on October 1, 2010 producers revealed that 40 people were already in the final phase of the casting process.

Twenty housemates entered the Gran Hermano house. They were split in two different houses, White house (House 1) and Color house (House 2). 9 women entered the color house and 9 men entered the white house. Rubén and Chari were ex, she entered the white house and Rubén entered the color house. All housemates had to get know each other by blind dates and after that chose their favourites or less favourites. On Day 5, women from color house chose their 4 favorite men from white house. Men from white house chose their 4 less favourite women from color house. Chari and Rubén's secret were discovered so they had to change house. On Day 47, the house was unified. On Day 82, five ex-housemates, Chari, Mireia, Oscar, Ruben, and Yago, returned to the Color House after an online public vote; a second round of online public voting on Day 89 decided for Ruben and Yago to officially return to the Gran Hermano house as official housemates; the other three housemates were re-evicted.

Anup
Anup Naraim is a male housemate from Bombay, India. He was the first Indian in Big Brother Spain. He entered on Day 1 into the white house. He loves to clean the house. He was considered by his peers as a traitor, as he was in one group to another to avoid being nominated. He has had disputes with Julia, Jhota, Terry, and Laura. After facing the public vote five times, he was finally evicted on Day 82.

Arturo
Arturo García is a male housemate from who entered on Day 33 as replacement for Julio and he entered the color house in a decision along with Pepa. He made friends with Yago and Marta a few days. His goal was to go mad at smokers, preventing them from smoking. Terry was his main enemy. He also has had disputes with Laura and Patricia. He was the seventh housemate to be evicted from Gran Hermano 12 with 82.1% of the public vote in his first nomination.

Cathaysa
Cathaysa Mogollon is a female housemate from Venezuela who entered on Day 1 into the color house. Her housemates call her 'Catha'. She hasn't had a special friendship with anyone. Sometimes she has been giving good advice to her housemates. She has been nominated for eviction four times and finally she was evicted in a very close eviction with Terry on Day 103.

Chari
Chari Lojo is a female housemate from who entered on Day 1 into the white house. She is Rubén's girlfriend. On Day 1, Chari and Rubén were told to keep their relationship as a secret but on Day 5 their secret was discovered so they were punished to be separated into different houses until further notice; she chose the color house to live that week. She was evicted on Day 75 and has ended her relationship with Ruben. On Day 82 she re-entered in House 2 with Mireia, Óscar, Rubén, and Yago, voted by the online public vote. On Day 89, she was re-evicted after losing a second round of the online public vote to become an official housemate again.

Dámaso
Dámaso Angulo is a male housemate from who entered on Day 1 into the white house. He is the youngest contestant of Gran Hermano, along with GH9's Amor Romeira. He revealed in the house that he is gay. In the house, he started a radical look change. He survived 5 nominations but in his sixth nomination he was evicted with 74% against Laura.

Eduardo
Eduardo Palomino is a male housemate who entered on Day 1 into the white house becoming the first hearing impaired person ever in Gran Hermano. He developed a strong friendship with Julia. He was evicted on Day 33 in a very close eviction with Cathaysa.

Flor
Florencia Luján is a female housemate from Argentina who entered on Day 1 into the color house. She was ejected on Day 19 as she planned with Julio how to obtain more money outside the house and feigning a false romance.

Jhota
Jose Ramón García known as Jhota is a male housemate who entered on Day 1 into the white house. He always wear a colour clothes. He developed a great friendship with Terry, Lydia and Patricia, which he was calling "The Jhota's girls ". He was considered to be the leader of his group. He was very a friend of Laura and Marcelo until they discussed strongly and broke his friendship. He was the twelfth housemate to be evicted from Gran Hermano house.

Joaquín
Joaquín Sanz is a male housemate who entered on Day 1 into the white house. He and Marta were couple in the house. On Day 40, he became the fifth person to be evicted from the house in a close eviction with Laura.

Julia
Julia Valverde is a gypsy female housemate who entered on Day 1 into the color house becoming the second gypsy person ever in Gran Hermano. She said before entering she had never had a toilet. She hated to Patricia and Anup. She didn't stop yelling. She was evicted with 62% of public votes on Day 26. She was evicted over Patricia.

Julio 'El Feroz'
Julio Granado known as 'El Feroz' is a male housemate who entered on Day 1 into the white house. He was ejected on Day 19 as he planned with Flor how to obtain more money outside the house and making a false romance.

Laura
Laura Campos is a female housemate who entered on Day 1 into the color house. She broke up with her real life boyfriend Samuel in the house to start a relationship with Marcelo. She was a contender to win the show all the time. On Round 13 she was automatically nominated by Big Brother as she had a big argument with Terry. She also had discussions with Jhota. She became the winner of Gran Hermano 12 with 63.1% of the public votes meaning that she is the fifth woman to win Gran Hermano.

Lydia
Lydia Navarro is a female housemate who entered on Day 1 into the color house. Lydia was chosen by Gran Hermano to visit the Big Brother Israel house on December 31, 2010 as part of a housemate exchange; after 5 days, she returned to Spain. She's got a daughter names Celia. She was considered by all of her housemates as a good person. He developed a strong friendship with Dámaso and Yago, and was part of "The Jhota's girls". She was considered a contender to win since she was evicted two weeks before the final with 72,7%. It didn't has explanation...

Marcelo
Marcelo Ciriaco is a male housemate who entered on Day 1 into the white house. He has developed a romance with Laura. They were all the program having arguments. He also had discussions with Terry, Jhota and Patricia. He was a goof friend of Rubén until he (Rubén) considered that Marcelo had cheated him saying that Chari had been bad in his absence. On Day 62, he temporarily left the house as part of a humanitarian trip set by Gran Hermano.

Marta
Marta López is a female housemate who entered on Day 1 into the color house. She had an affair with Joaquín but he didn't anything with her. She has the record for Gran Hermano of being nominated for ten times, she survived 9 times. She finally was the last person to be evicted on Day 138 with 66,1% She was a contender to win, but When the contest advanced she started losing energy and going out. She had problems with Jhota and Terry, and she was very a friend of Mireia, Rubén, Chari and Yago. Nonetheless, she seemed to feel very alone most of the time.

Mireia
Mireia Carrillo is a female housemate who entered on Day 1 into the color house. Her idol is Madonna. She has made a video clip in 2008 named "Hey Boy, Hey Girl", and her nickname is MIVIC. She was good friend of Marta. She became the second person to be evicted by the public vote on Day 19. She returned to the house on Day 82 for an opportunity to become an official housemate again; she was re-evicted the following week after losing the second round of voting. She never set a foot on the white house.

Óscar
Óscar Casado is a male housemate who entered on Day 1 into the white house. On Day 12 he was the first housemate to be evicted. He was best friend of Yago and Julio. He returned to the house on Day 82 for an opportunity to become an official housemate again.

Patricia
Patricia Hurtado is a female housemate who entered on Day 1 into the color house. Her biggest enemy in the house is Julia. The program gave her a rabbit called Bonita. She was always singing and she demonstrated to be like a child. She was friend of Terry and Jhota, and was always with they. She was considered a contender to win but was evicted on Day 96.

Pepa
Pepa Beltrán is a female housemate who entered on Day 33 as replacement for Flor. She entered into the color house in a decision along with Arturo. She considered herself a goof strategy, but on Day 47, she was the sixth person to be evicted from Gran Hermano house with 76.4% of public votes. She only rest 14 days in the house.

Rubén
Rubén Estévez is a male housemate who entered on Day 1 into the color house. He is Chari's boyfriend. On Day 1, Chari and Rubén were told to keep their relationship as a secret but on Day 5 their secret was discovered so they were punished to be separated until further notice; he chose the white house to live that week. He was evicted on Day 61 with 60.6% of the public vote, and during his eviction interview, he ended his relationship with Chari. He returned to the house on Day 82 for an opportunity to become an official housemate again. Rubén was evicted on Day 117 again with 38,7% of the votes.

Terry
Terry Willis Pérez is a female housemate who entered on Day 1 into the color house. She lost 46 kilos before enter in Gran Hermano. On Day 5 she was elected by men and she remained at the color house. On Round 13 she was automatically nominated because of a big argument with Laura. She was friend of Patricia, and it seemed that she liked Jhota. She had a lot of arguments into the house until she was evicted on Day 110 with 62,19% of public votes.

Yago
Yago Hermida is a male housemate who entered on Day 1 into the white house. He was evicted on Day 68 with 51.5% of the vote. He returned to the house on Day 82 for an opportunity to become an official housemate again. On Day 117 as he was the person with least nomination votes he was able to find the time capsule which meant that he was the first finalist of Gran Hermano 12 and for this reason he was immune for the last two rounds.

Housemate Exchange & Big Brother Song Contest
Shortly after Christmas 2010, it was confirmed by the Big Brother Israel website that a housemate exchange will take place with the Gran Hermano Spain house. On December 29, the BB Israel hosts confirmed that housemate Yaakov "Jackie" Menahem will travel to Spain in exchange with Lydia Navarro. Jackie arrived to the GH house on December 30 (Day 75) and Lydia left on New Year's Day (Day 77). Both housemates spent 5 days in each houses.

It was also confirmed that a global Big Brother Song Contest will take place with the two countries along with Big Brother editions in Argentina, Greece, and Italy as jurors. The housemates involved in the exchange will assist their new housemates in two songs which were performed in the Eurovision Song Contest. Big Brother Israel performed their song on January 5, 2011 and Gran Hermano Spain performed the follow day. It was announced that the Gran Hermano Spain housemates won the contest earning top scores from all three jurors.

Nominations

Nominations and eviction notes
  The housemates in house 1 had to nominate 2 people in a group consensus, meaning all housemates had to agree on the potential nominees for eviction. It was decided that the two nominees would be Julio and Lydia. These nominees then had to choose from Marta, Óscar and Yago for who would be the third and fourth nominee. They chose Marta and Óscar.
  The housemates in house 1 had to nominate 2 people in a group consensus, meaning all housemates had to agree on the potential nominees for eviction. It was decided that the two nominees would be Marcelo and Patricia. These nominees then had to choose from Flor, Joaquín, Julio and Mireia for who would be the third and fourth nominee. They chose Joaquín and Mireia. Terry won immunity because she was chosen by the housemates in house 2 as joker and she could nominate on any housemate behalf from color house. She chose Yago.
  The housemates in house 1 had to nominate 2 people in a group consensus, meaning all housemates had to agree on the potential nominees for eviction. It was decided that the two nominees would be Anup and Julia. These nominees then had to choose from Cathaysa, Jhota, Joaquín, Marta and Patricia for who would be the third and fourth nominee. They chose Marta and Patricia.
  Flor and Julio were ejected due to they planned what must do in the house to obtain more money outside the program which is against the rules.
  The housemates switched houses and Patricia as second one with most public votes could choose house which she would like to live that week. The housemates in house 1 had to nominate 2 people in a group consensus, meaning all housemates had to agree on the potential nominees for eviction. It was decided that the two nominees would be Cathaysa and Terry. These nominees then had to choose from Anup, Dámaso, Eduardo, Lauda and Lydia for who would be the third and fourth nominee. They chose Eduardo and Lydia. Jhota won immunity because he was chosen by the housemates in house 1 as joker.
  The nominations took place in houses at the beginning of the show, after nominations the housemates changed houses, which explains some of housemates nominated with other house's nomination process. The housemates in house 1 had to nominate 2 people in a group consensus, meaning all housemates had to agree on the potential nominees for eviction. Patricia won immunity as she passed a secret mission. It was decided that the two nominees would be Joaquín and Marta. These nominees then had to choose from Dámaso, Laura and Lydia for who would be the third and fourth nominee. They chose Laura and Lydia.
  Arturo and Pepa are new housemates as replacement for Julio and Flor who were ejected. They chose the new distribution of both houses.
  The housemates in house 1 had to nominate 2 people in a group consensus, meaning all housemates had to agree on the potential nominees for eviction. It was decided that the two nominees would be Cathaysa and Lydia. These nominees then had to choose from Patricia, Pepa, and Terry for who would be the third and fourth nominee. They chose Pepa and Terry. Chari won immunity because she was chosen by the housemates in house 2 as joker and she could send any housemate to the other house. She chose Laura who was she second one with most evict votes. Laura moved from house 2 to house 1 by decision of Chari.
  The housemates in house 1 had to nominate 2 people in a group consensus, meaning all housemates had to agree on the potential nominees for eviction. It was decided that the two nominees would be Anup and Dámaso. These nominees then had to choose from Arturo, Marta, and Patricia for who would be the third and fourth nominee. They chose Arturo and Marta. After nominations, both houses merged as one house and all the housemates will live together.
  The housemates had to choose between two diary rooms. *Housemates nominating 3,2 and 1 points positively to housemates they want to stay in the house. The rest of housemates nominated as they used to do.
  This week housemates were nominating to save, not evict. The Housemates with the least support from their fellow Housemates were nominated.
  On Day 82, five ex-housemates, Chari, Mireia, Óscar, Rubén, and Yago, returned to the Color House after an online public vote; A second round of online public voting will decide the top two ex-housemates to officially return to the Gran Hermano house as official housemates.
  Rubén was the first housemate to re-enter into the house with 43.17% and Yago was the second one to re-enter into the house with 25.97%. Laura and Terry were automatically nominated by Gran Hermano (Big Brother) after bad behavior between them.
  During the nominations, the housemates have travelled across the cursed temple. The housemates could find 9 stones which count 1 point. The housemates could distribute the points however they liked.
  Yago is immune as he passed a secret mission. This week, the housemates nominate to save two housemates and not to evict.
  Yago is immune as he passed a secret mission.
  For the final round, the public are voting for who they want to win Gran Hermano 12.

El Debate: Blind Results
Gran Hermano presents 'El Debate' on Sunday nights presented by Jordi González, a debate show featuring the latest evictee and special guests; blind results shows the progress of the public vote for the next eviction show but doesn't reveal which housemate has the percentage.

Ratings

"Galas"

See also
 Main Article about the show

External links
 Gran Hermano 12 Official Website at Telecinco
 Gran Hermano Main Site

2010 Spanish television seasons
2011 Spanish television seasons
GH 12